Ethan Russell Katz (born July 4, 1983) is an American professional baseball coach, and former minor league baseball player. He is the pitching coach for the Chicago White Sox of Major League Baseball (MLB).  Prior to that, Katz served as the assistant pitching coach of the San Francisco Giants in the 2020 season. He attended East Los Angeles College, and then Sacramento State for  college baseball.

Playing career
Katz was born in Los Angeles, California. Katz is of Jewish background. He attended University High School in West Los Angeles, California. There, he was All-City, League MVP, and All-League.

He was drafted by the Seattle Mariners in the 47th round of the 2001 MLB draft, but did not sign. Instead he attended East Los Angeles College for one season, before transferring to Sacramento State for two seasons of college baseball. He was drafted by the Colorado Rockies in the 26th round of the 2005 MLB draft.

Katz played in the Rockies organization from 2005 through 2008. In 2005 with the Tri-City Dust Devils of the Class A- Northwest League he was 4–1 with a 2.35 ERA in 21 games (7 starts). In 2006 back with the Dust Devils he was 4–4 with a 2.15 ERA in 29 games (one start), and with the Asheville Tourists of the Class A South Atlantic League he was 2–0 with a 6.05 ERA in 11 relief appearances. In 2007, back with the Tourists he was 3–2 with a 2.96 ERA in 19 relief appearances. He split 2008 between the Dust Devils, for whom he was 0–0 with a 1.08 ERA in 8 relief appearances, and the Tourists, for whom he was 0–0 with a 3.00 ERA in 14 relief appearances. He then played for the Victoria Seals of the Golden Baseball League in 2009, for whom he was 1–3 with a 6.75 ERA in 27 relief appearances.

Coaching career
Katz's first coaching position was as the pitching coach at Harvard-Westlake High School in North Hollywood, California, from September 2009 to July 2013, where he helped coach future major league pitchers Max Fried, Lucas Giolito, and Jack Flaherty. He served as the pitching coach for the collegiate summer baseball league La Crosse Loggers of the Northwoods League for the 2011 and 2012 seasons.

He joined the Los Angeles Angels organization, and served as the pitching coach for the Arizona League Angels in 2013 and for the Class A Burlington Bees of the Class A  Midwest League in 2014 and 2015. Katz then spent the 2016 through 2018 seasons as a pitching coach in the Seattle Mariners organization, in 2016 for the Bakersfield Blaze of the Class A+ California League, where he was named Coach of the Year, and in 2017–18 for the Arkansas Travelers of the Class AA Texas League.

Katz was hired by the San Francisco Giants and served as their assistant minor league pitching coordinator in 2019.

On December 11, 2019, Katz was promoted by the Giants to be their assistant pitching coach.

On November 12, 2020, Katz was hired by the Chicago White Sox to be their pitching coach. Katz was referred to the White Sox by star pitcher Lucas Giolito, who played for Katz at Harvard-Westlake High School in California.

References

External links

1983 births
Living people
Sportspeople from Santa Clarita, California
Baseball coaches from California
Baseball players from California
Baseball pitchers
Chicago White Sox coaches
Major League Baseball pitching coaches
San Francisco Giants coaches
East Los Angeles Huskies baseball players
Sacramento State Hornets baseball players
Tri-City Dust Devils players
Asheville Tourists players
Victoria Seals players
Minor league baseball coaches
University High School (Los Angeles) alumni
California State University, Sacramento alumni